Carter Loard Bays (born August 12, 1975) is an American author, composer and television showrunner. 

Bays co-created the CBS sitcom How I Met Your Mother where he served as showrunner, writer and executive producer for all nine seasons. The show received ten Primetime Emmy Awards.

Bays wrote the novel, The Mutual Friend (2022, Dutton Books).

Early life

Bays was born in Cleveland, Ohio. His father, James C. Bays, is a retired corporate lawyer, and his mother, Martha Bays, is a minister in the United Church of Christ.  

While at Shaker Heights High School, Bays' play Five Visits From Mr. Whitcomb was selected for the Stephen Sondheim founded Young Playwrights Inc. 1993 Young Playwrights Festival produced at Playwrights Horizon's in New York City.

Bays studied English at Wesleyan University, where he met bandmate Craig Thomas who would later become his writing partner and his co-creator for How I Met Your Mother.

Bays and Thomas co-founded the band The Solids, who perform the theme song to How I Met Your Mother, "Hey Beautiful". as well as the Emmy-nominated "Nothing Suits Me Like A Suit."

In the summer of 1996, Bays and Thomas worked as interns in the Development department of MTV.

Career
After graduating from Wesleyan in 1997, Bays and Craig Thomas went on to write for the Late Show With David Letterman.

He and Thomas then created How I Met Your Mother, which ran from 2005-2014.

Bays also wrote for American Dad!, Quintuplets Oliver Beene. and co-created Fox's The Goodwin Games.

In 2022, Bays served as executive producer on Hulu's How I Met Your Father, starring Hilary Duff. The show is created by Isaac Aptaker and Elizabeth Berger.

Carter's debut novel, The Mutual Friend, was published June 7th, 2022, through Dutton Books, and received a starred review from both Kirkus and Booklist.

Personal life

One of Carter's daughters appeared at the end of "Trilogy Time", the other one at the end of "Unpause".

Bays teaches a Master Class in TV Writing at Columbia University, and is an Associate Fellow at Davenport College at Yale University. He also serves on the board of the Armed Services Arts Partnership, which helps veterans return to civilian life through comedy and the arts.

He has stated he is a member of the Democratic Socialists of America.

Works

How I Met Your Mother 
 "Pilot"
 "Purple Giraffe"
 "The Pineapple Incident"
 "Life Among the Gorillas"
 "Nothing Good Happens After 2 A.M."
 "Milk"
 "Come On"
 "Where Were We?"
 "Monday Night Football"
 "Bachelor Party"
 "Something Blue"
 "Wait for It"
 "The Platinum Rule"
 "No Tomorrow"
 "Ten Sessions"
 "The Chain of Screaming"
 "Miracles"
 "Do I Know You?"
 "The Best Burger in New York"
 "Woooo!"
 "The Stinsons"
 "As Fast as She Can"
 "The Leap"
 "Definitions"
 "Robin 101"
 "The Playbook"
 "Girls Versus Suits"
 "Rabbit or Duck"
 "Doppelgangers"
 "Big Days"
 "Architect of Destruction"
 "Natural History"
 "Last Words"
 "Oh Honey"
 "Landmarks"
 "Challenge Accepted"
 "The Best Man"
 "Ducky Tie"
 "The Rebound Girl"
 "Tailgate"
 "The Burning Beekeeper"
 "The Broath"
 "Good Crazy"
 "The Magician's Code"
 "Farhampton"
 "The Pre-Nup"
 "The Final Page"
 "Band or DJ?"
 "P.S. I Love You"
 "Bad Crazy"
 "The Ashtray"
 "The Time Travelers"
 "Something Old"
 "Something New"
 "The Locket"
 "Coming Back"
 "Mom And Dad"
 "Bedtime Stories"
 "Bass Player Wanted"
 "Slapsgiving 3: Slappointment in Slapmarra"
 "How Your Mother Met Me"
 "Sunrise"
 "Rally"
 "Daisy"
 "The End of the Aisle"
 "Last Forever"

Oliver Beene 
 "Dancing Beene"
 "The Nudie Mag"
 "X-Ray Specs"
 "A Trip To Coney Island"
 "Oliver & The Otters"

The Goodwin Games 
 "Pilot"
 "Hamletta"

American Dad! 
 "Stan of Arabia: Part 2"

How I Met Your Father 
 "Pilot"

Notes

References
 

Living people
1975 births
American television writers
American male television writers
Television producers from Ohio
How I Met Your Mother
Showrunners
Members of the Democratic Socialists of America
Wesleyan University alumni
Writers from Shaker Heights, Ohio
Screenwriters from Ohio